La figlia del diavolo or La fille du diable is a 1952 French-Italian historical drama film directed by Primo Zeglio and starring Massimo Serato, Paola Barbara, and Marina Vlady.

Plot
Garibaldi, after landing in Marsala, moves on to Naples. The liberals are overjoyed but the Bourbons are terrified. The so-called Baron Tucci, on a recommendation from England, arrives at the home of Count Sereni, a notable liberal. But he turns out not to be a patriot who has returned to Italy to take part in the fight but a degraded Bourbon official who has been promised rehabilitation if he can succeed as a spy. Tucci discovers old Sereni's second wife is one of his former lovers and persuades her to murder her husband so as to gain his inheritance. She does indeed cause the count to die, by withholding his heart medicine, but not before he destroys his will. The count's younger daughter hears the argument which breaks out between the lovers. The false baron tries to kill her but she escapes, racing off to the river. There she is saved by a patriot, who takes her to the devil's castle, where conspirators are meeting. On hearing the news, the spy contacts the police, who arrest the girl's fiancé, a young doctor, one of the leading patriots. Sentenced to death, he is about to be hanged but is saved at the last minute by Garibaldi's cavalry. After dealing with the spy, the young patriot joins his beloved fiancée.

Cast
Massimo Serato as Adolfo Santagata
Paola Barbara as Donna Giulia
Marina Vlady as Graziella, figlia del conte Terzi
Carlo Tamberlani as Conte Vincenzo Terzi
Roberto Risso as Roberto
Franco Pastorino as Carlo
Juan de Landa as Il boia
Lauro Gazzolo as Il farmacista
Nico Pepe as Lo 'sconosciuto'
Edda Soligo as Clotilde
Luisa Rivelli as Carolina
Franco Marturano as Il capo delle informazioni
Edoardo Toniolo as Capitano borbonico
Emilio Petacci as Girolamo
Mario Feliciani as Domenico

Produced
The film was an Italian production; Rise Stevens was involved with the production of the film at Milan's La Scala.

References

External links

1952 films
1950s Italian-language films
Films directed by Primo Zeglio
Films scored by Carlo Rustichelli
Films set in the 1860s
Italian historical drama films
1950s historical drama films
Minerva Film films
Italian black-and-white films
1950s Italian films
1950s French films
French historical drama films